Cristobal Ramas (born 15 February 1935) is a Filipino former basketball player who competed in the 1960 Summer Olympics.

The 6-4 Ramas is one of the tallest cagers that ever donned the Philippine uniform in international competitions. Aside from the 1960 Rome Olympics, Ramas also saw action in the 1962 Asian Games in Jakarta. He is a product of the University of the Visayas in Cebu City.

After playing for UV in the Cebu Collegiate Athletic Association, He took up commerce at University of Santo Tomas and played with the Glowing Goldies in the UAAP tournament from 1957 to 1959 and then went back to Cebu and got his commerce degree at Colegio de San Jose.

Ramas' height and bulk impressed Lauro Mumar who took him to play for the Seven-Up Marauders in 1960. He played for Seven-Up for only seven months after which he transferred to MICAA champion Ysmael Steel. He was with the Admirals for four years. Crispa recruited Ramas in 1963 and he was with the Redmanizers until 1965 before he stopped playing upon being employed at the Philippine National Bank.

References

External links
 

1935 births
Living people
Basketball players from Cebu
Olympic basketball players of the Philippines
Basketball players at the 1960 Summer Olympics
Asian Games medalists in basketball
Basketball players at the 1962 Asian Games
Philippines men's national basketball team players
Filipino men's basketball players
University of the Visayas alumni
Asian Games gold medalists for the Philippines
UST Growling Tigers basketball players
Medalists at the 1962 Asian Games